Oldham is a city in Kingsbury County, South Dakota, United States. The population was 133 at the 2010 census.

Some say the city was named for Oldham Carrot, a local landowner, while others believe the name is a transfer from Oldham, England, the native home of a first settler.

Geography
Oldham is located at  (44.228219, -97.308979).

Oldham has been assigned the ZIP code 57051 and the FIPS place code 46780.

The Loriks Peterson Heritage House is on the National Register of Historic Places.

Demographics

2010 census
As of the census of 2010, there were 133 people, 65 households, and 33 families residing in the city. The racial makeup of the city was 100.0% White. Hispanic or Latino of any race were 2.3% of the population.

There were 65 households, of which 20.0% had children under the age of 18 living with them, 41.5% were married couples living together, 6.2% had a female householder with no husband present, 3.1% had a male householder with no wife present, and 49.2% were non-families. 47.7% of all households were made up of individuals, and 27.7% had someone living alone who was 65 years of age or older. The average household size was 2.05 and the average family size was 2.97.

The median age in the city was 46.8 years. 22.6% of residents were under the age of 18; 9.8% were between the ages of 18 and 24; 14.4% were from 25 to 44; 30.2% were from 45 to 64; and 23.3% were 65 years of age or older. The gender makeup of the city was 48.9% male and 51.1% female.

2000 census
As of the census of 2000, there were 206 people, 91 households, and 51 families residing in the city. The population density was 948.3 people per square mile (361.5/km2). There were 106 housing units at an average density of 487.9 per square mile (186.0/km2). The racial makeup of the city was 100.00% White.

There were 91 households, out of which 25.3% had children under the age of 18 living with them, 46.2% were married couples living together, 6.6% had a female householder with no husband present, and 42.9% were non-families. 41.8% of all households were made up of individuals, and 25.3% had someone living alone who was 65 years of age or older. The average household size was 2.26 and the average family size was 3.04.

In the city, the population was spread out, with 28.2% under the age of 18, 6.3% from 18 to 24, 18.4% from 25 to 44, 19.9% from 45 to 64, and 27.2% who were 65 years of age or older. The median age was 44 years. For every 100 females, there were 77.6 males. For every 100 females age 18 and over, there were 78.3 males.

The median income for a household in the city was $21,458, and the median income for a family was $30,000. Males had a median income of $34,688 versus $20,208 for females. The per capita income for the city was $11,694. About 12.5% of families and 20.3% of the population were below the poverty line, including 40.7% of those under the age of eighteen and 6.6% of those 65 or over.

References

Cities in South Dakota
Cities in Kingsbury County, South Dakota